Rónán Mac Aodha Bhuí is an Irish broadcaster who broadcasts mainly through Irish. He is known particularly for his popular magazine programme Rónán Beo on RTÉ Raidió na Gaeltachta. He was born on 6 May 1970 in Cork, but was brought up in Gweedore, in the Donegal gaeltacht, where he attended Bunscoil Bhun Bhig and Pobalscoil Ghaoth Dobhair. He is the youngest son of the author  and comes from a family of eight. 

He studied journalism in Dublin before going on to work at several different radio stations, including Radio Ireland, RTÉ and RTÉ Raidió na Gaeltachta. He has also written for the Irish language publications Anois, Lá and Nós. Outside of his work at Raidió na Gaeltachta, he is active in the entertainment industry and established An Ciorcal Craiceáilte, now defunct, and An Cabaret Craiceáilte, which aims to bring entertainment, particularly music, to Gaeltacht areas and to Gweedore in particular. An Cabaret Craiceáilte usually takes place once a month, and annually at The Soma Festival in Castlewellan, County Down.

Rónán Mac Aodha Bhuí has enjoyed much acclaim and popularity, and in 2011 won the Celtic Media award for Radio Personality of the Year. He has also been awarded two Oireachtas media awards, for Radio Personality of the Year and Radio Series of the Year (for his programme Rónán Beo@3) respectively.

In 2013 he presented the series Rónán ar an Camino on TG4, based on his experiences walking the Way of St. James (Camino de Santiago).

References

RTÉ Raidió na Gaeltachta presenters
Living people
1970 births
People from Cork (city)
People from Gweedore
TG4 presenters